Paippin Chuvattile Pranayam is a 2017 Indian Malayalam-language film directed by Domin D'Silva who also co-wrote the screenplay with Antony Jibin. It stars Neeraj Madhav, Reba Monica John, Aju Varghese, Sudhi Koppa, Appani Sarath, Dharmajan Bolgatty and Thesni Khan. The film was released in India on 24 November 2017.

Plot
Paippin Chuvattile Pranayam traces the story of a young Govindankutty (Neeraj Madhav) and his friends, who are the local payans of Pandarathuruth island. As the movie starts, one can see that it takes a dip into the rustic beauty of the village and the surreal experience of lake water fishing.

Cast

Soundtrack
The songs and background score for the film were composed by Bijibal. The lyrics were written by B.K. Harinarayanan & Santhosh Varma.

References

External links
 
 

2010s Malayalam-language films
2017 films
Water scarcity in fiction
Films about water